Trailer Park Boys: Jail is a Canadian mockumentary television series created by John Paul Tremblay, Robb Wells and Mike Smith (actor). It is a spin-off of the series Trailer Park Boys. The show follows the misadventures of a group of trailer park residents, mostly from inside the prison. The series premiered on swearnet.com on January 1, 2021, and ran for a season. A second Christmas special was also announced, featuring unseen footage of John Dunsworth before his death in October 2017.

Production 
The filming of a new season of Trailer Park Boys was announced on 1 October 2019 on the official facebook page of Trailer Park Boys. Dave Lawrence was roped in the series for the first time.

Premise 

Episodes revolve around Sunnyvale Trailer Park residents Ricky and Julian being in Sunnyvale Correctional Facility while they try to party only to realize things aren't the same in prison anymore.

References

External links 

 
 
 

 
Alcohol abuse in television
Bisexuality-related television series
Poverty in television
Television shows set in Nova Scotia
Television shows filmed in Halifax, Nova Scotia
English-language television shows
Canadian mockumentary television series
Canadian television series revived after cancellation
Mass media portrayals of the working class
Canadian television shows featuring puppetry
Canadian television spin-offs
2020s Canadian sitcoms
2020s Canadian satirical television series
2021 Canadian television series debuts